is a Japanese professional shogi player ranked 7-dan.

Promotion history
The promotion history for Okazaki is as follows:
1981: 6-kyū
1986: 1-dan
1993, October 1: 4-dan
1998, April 1: 5-dan
2004, June 15: 6-dan
2018, February 19: 7-dan

References

External links
 ShogiHub: Professional Player Info · Okazaki, Hiroshi

1967 births
Japanese shogi players
Living people
Professional shogi players
Professional shogi players from Chiba Prefecture
Free class shogi players